Andrew Henry Sommerville (born as Henry Travers Summersgill, February 6, 1876 – June 16, 1931) was a 19th-century Major League Baseball pitcher, physician and college football and baseball coach. As a pitcher he appeared in one game for the 1894 Brooklyn Grooms, giving up six runs in one-third of an inning while walking five batters. He served as the head football coach of Tulane University from 1900 to 1901 and the head baseball coach in 1902.

College and coaching career
A native of Vermont, Summersgill originally attended Brown University, where he played on the football team in 1896, but transferred to the University of Virginia in 1898. He played football at Virginia as an end from 1898 to 1899, and was elected the team captain for the 1899 season. He was a member of Beta Theta Pi.

Summersgill then attended medical school at Tulane University. He took over as the part-time head football coach from H. T. "Pop" Collier for the 1900 season. In his first season, Tulane finished undefeated and unscored upon with a perfect 5–0 record, which was an impressive turnaround from a scoreless 0–6–1 campaign the year prior. The team outscored the Southern Athletic Club, Alabama, LSU, and Mississippi by a combined 105–;0 margin. The next year, Tulane finished 1901 with a 4–2 mark. Against the Mobile Y.M.C.A., Tulane lost, 2–0, despite Summersgill's protests to the officials that there was still time remaining in the game. The Olive and Blue later beat LSU, 22–0, on the field, but was forced to forfeit 11–0 by the Southern Intercollegiate Athletic Association over the use of a professional player. Today, Tulane records still count this as a win, which LSU records dispute.

Summersgill received a Doctor of Medicine degree from Tulane in 1900. In May 1901, he was licensed after passing the medical examination at Tulane. In 1902, Summersgill coached the Tulane baseball team and amassed an 8–5 record.

Medical career
In 1905, he was the medical officer in charge at the Bohio Hospital in the Canal Zone at Bohio, Panama. He served as superintendent of the City Hospital in Cincinnati, and later, as the head of the University of California Hospital in San Francisco. After a ten-week illness, he died on June 16, 1931, of a cerebral hemorrhage at the Jamaica Hospital in Queens, New York.

Head coaching record

Football

References

External links
 
 

1876 births
1931 deaths
19th-century players of American football
19th-century baseball players
American football ends
Brooklyn Grooms players
Brown Bears football players
Major League Baseball pitchers
Tulane Green Wave football coaches
Tulane Green Wave baseball coaches
Virginia Cavaliers football players
All-Southern college football players
Tulane University School of Medicine alumni
Sportspeople from Brooklyn
Baseball players from New York City
Baseball players from Vermont
Coaches of American football from Vermont
Players of American football from Vermont
Physicians from California
Physicians from Ohio